Retour à Gorée (English: Return to Gorée) is a 2007 musical documentary road movie directed by Pierre-Yves Borgeaud, featuring  singer Youssou N'Dour's journey along the trail left by slaves and by the jazz music they invented. Youssou N'Dour's challenge is to bring back to Africa a jazz repertoire and to sing those tunes in Goree, the island that today symbolizes the slave trade and stands to commemorate its victims. Guided in his mission by the pianist Moncef Genoud, Youssou N'Dour travels across the United States of America and Europe. Accompanied by some of the world's most exceptional musicians, they meet peoples and well known figures, and create, through concerts, encounters and debates. Their music transcends cultural division.

Awards 
 Nyon Visions du Réel (Switzerland) 2007

References

External links

2007 films
Luxembourgian documentary films
Senegalese documentary films
2007 documentary films
Swazi documentary films
Documentary films about African music
Documentary films about slavery
2000s French-language films
Documentary films about jazz music and musicians